Liolaemus normae, the Los Cristales leopard lizard or Norma's leopard lizard, is a species of lizard in the family Iguanidae.  It is found in Chile.

References

normae
Lizards of South America
Reptiles of Chile
Endemic fauna of Chile
Reptiles described in 2019
Taxa named by Damien Esquerré
Taxa named by Jaime Troncoso-Palacios